This is a list of players who represented the Western Australian football team in State of Origin, held between 1977 and 1998. State of Origin was introduced in 1977 to allow Western-Australia-born players in the Victorian Football League (VFL) to play for their home state. Previously, only players playing in the Western Australian National Football League (WANFL) or the Goldfields National Football League (GNFL) had qualified to represent Western Australia.

List of players

Captains
A total of 15 different players captained Western Australia at State of Origin level:

Coaches
A total of 15 different people coached Western Australia at State of Origin level:

References

Australian rules interstate football

Australian rules football-related lists